Vladimír Balát (born 1 February 1987) is a Slovak footballer who currently plays for the Austrian non-league club SC Kirchberg.

Career
In February 2011, he was loaned to Ruch Radzionków on a half year deal. He returned to Górnik Zabrze half a year later. He was released from Górnik on 22 August 2011.

Honours
FC ViOn Zlaté Moravce
Slovak Cup: 2006–07

References

External links 
 

1987 births
Living people
Slovak footballers
MŠK Žilina players
FC ViOn Zlaté Moravce players
Górnik Zabrze players
Ruch Radzionków players
FK Bodva Moldava nad Bodvou players
MŠK Rimavská Sobota players
Expatriate footballers in Poland
Slovak expatriate sportspeople in Poland
Expatriate footballers in Norway
Association football midfielders
Slovak expatriate footballers
Slovak expatriate sportspeople in Norway
Slovak expatriate sportspeople in the Czech Republic
Expatriate footballers in the Czech Republic
Expatriate footballers in Austria
Slovak expatriate sportspeople in Austria